James Madison Park is a  waterfront park located on Lake Mendota in Madison, Wisconsin. It is owned by the city of Madison.

Gates of Heaven Synagogue

The park is the home of the Gates of Heaven Synagogue (Shaarei Shamayim).  The 1863 building, a popular site for weddings of all faiths, is the eighth-oldest synagogue building still standing in the United States.   In the 1970s it was purchased by the city, restored, and moved to the park.

Bernard - Hoover Boat House
The park is also home to the Bernard - Hoover Boat House. This is owned by the City of Madison, and occupied by Mendota Rowing Club.

References

Geography of Madison, Wisconsin
Parks in Wisconsin
Protected areas of Dane County, Wisconsin
Tourist attractions in Madison, Wisconsin